Louis K. Liggett Co. v. Lee, 288 U.S. 517 (1933), is a corporate law decision from the United States Supreme Court.

In his opinion, Justice Brandeis endorsed the theories that state corporate law, and lack of federal standards, enabled a race to the bottom in corporate law rules, or one of "laxity". He also expounded the evidence that the Great Depression was caused by disparities of income and wealth brought about by the corporation, which he likened to Frankenstein's monster.

Facts
The case involved retail business taxes in the Florida being based on the number of stores and not the value or sales of the stores.

Judgment
The majority of the Supreme Court, with the opinion delivered by Roberts J, held that § 5 of the Florida Act, which increased tax if stores were present in more than one county, was unreasonable and arbitrary and violated the equal protection clause. 

Justice Brandeis dissented. He agreed with the race to the bottom theory of corporate law, proposed by Adolf Berle and Gardiner Means in The Modern Corporation and Private Property (1932).

See also
 US corporate law
 UK company law

References

External links
 

United States corporate case law
United States Supreme Court cases
United States Supreme Court cases of the Hughes Court
United States taxation and revenue case law
Legal history of Florida
1933 in United States case law